Diaphorolepis is a genus of snakes in the family Colubridae. The genus is indigenous to northwestern South America.

Species
The genus Diaphorolepis contains the following two species which are recognized as being valid.
Diaphorolepis laevis  – Colombian frog-eating snake
Diaphorolepis wagneri  – Ecuador frog-eating snake, Ecuadorean frog-eating snake

Etymology
The specific name, wagneri, is in honor of German paleontologist Johann Andreas Wagner.

References

Further reading
Jan G (1863). Elenco sistematico degli ofidi descritti e disegnati per l'Iconografia Generale. Milan: Museo Civico di Milano. (A. Lombardi, printer). 143 pp. (Diaphorolepis, new genus, p. 98; D. wagneri, new species, p. 98). (in Italian).

Diaphorolepis
Snake genera